Peter Beier Chokolade, usually referred to as Peter Beier, is a Danish premium chocolate manufacturing and retailing company founded by Linda and Peter Beier in 1996. It is based at the Ørsholt estate outside Helsingør.

History
Peter Beier was born in Slangerup in 1965. He was educated as a pastry chef in Stubbekøbing on the island of Falster in 1985 and headed Magasin du Nord's chokolaterie from 1987. Linda Beier has a law degree from University of Copenhagen. They founded Peter Beier Chokolade in 1996. The first Peter Beier chocolate store opened in Copenhagen in 2000 and the first combined café and chocolate store opened on Falkoner Allé in Frederiksberg in 2002. In 2003, the company acquired its own cocoa plantation in the Dominican Republic to have better control of the supply chain. Another 11 stores opened between 2003 and 2014. The first store outside Denmark opened in Malmö, Sweden. It was followed by a store in Dubai in 2016.

Products

The product range includes filled chocolates, chocolate pastilles, chocolate powder and traditional Danish products such as flødeboller and pålægschokolade

Chocolate stores
As of 2015, Peter Beier has 19 chocolate stores of which five are shop-in-shop concepts operated in collaboration with Meny supermarkets. The company also has its own online store.

In 2021 they started selling homemade scooped ice cream in wafer cones and small low cups, and have many flavors to choose from. They also have soft-serve ice cream, with raspberry and vanilla flavor and also provides a variant that have both mixed.

Denmark
Copenhagen
 Skoubogade 1 (Strøget), city centre
 Store Kongensgade 3, city centre
 Terminal 2, Copenhagen Airport, Amager
 Falkoner Allé 43, Frederiksberg
 Nordre Frihavnsgade 20m Østerbrogade
 Rotundenm Strandvejen 64A, Hellerup
 Lyngby Hovedgade 47, Kongens Lyngby
 Vermlandsgade 51 (Meny), Amager
 Nærumvænge Torv 18 (Meny), Nærum
 Bagsværd Hovedgade 128 (Meny), Bagsværd

Helsingør
 Ørsholtvej 35

Hørsholm
 Hovedgaden, Hørsholm Midtpunkt 16
 Kongevejs Centret 6 (Meny), Hørsholm

 Stenløse
 Egedal Centret 33, st., Stenløse

Aalborg
 Otto Mønsteds Vej 1 (Meny), Aalborg

Aarhus
 Ryesgade 35, Aarhus

Odense
 Mågebakken 4-6 (Meny), Odense

Sweden
 Helsingborg
 Södra Storgatan 5, Helsingborg

Malmö
 Baltzargatan 32

Chocolate lounges
Two "chocolate lounges" are currently operated in association with the chocolate stores in Store Kongensgade and Nordre Frihavnsgade in Copenhagen.  In 2016, it was announced that a chocolaterie with on-site chocolate production and café will open in Axel Towers, opposite the main entrance to Tivoli Gardens.

References

External links

 Official website

Danish chocolate companies
Companies based in Helsingør Municipality
Danish companies established in 1996
Food and drink companies established in 1996
Coffeehouses and cafés in Aarhus
Coffeehouses and cafés in Denmark
People from Frederikssund Municipality
Restaurants in Copenhagen